The Miracle Inn is an album by Euros Childs, released in August 2007. It was his third solo album. It features a cover of The Turtles' "Think I'll Run Away".

Track listing
All tracks written by Euros Childs except where noted.

 "Over You"
 "Horse Riding"
 "Ali Day"
 "Think I'll Run Away" (Howard Kaylan, Mark Volman)
 "Outside My Window"
 "Hard Times Wondering"
 "Miracle Inn"
 "Go Back Soon"

2007 albums
Euros Childs albums
Wichita Recordings albums